Henningsomyces is a genus of fungi in the family Marasmiaceae.

The genus name of Grovesia is in honour of Paul Christoph Hennings (1841–1908), who was a German mycologist and herbarium curator.

The genus was circumscribed by Carl Ernst Otto Kuntze in Revis. Gen. Pl. vol.3 (issue 3) on page 483 in 1898.

Species
, Index Fungorum lists 10 species in Henningsomyces:

See also
List of Agaricales genera
List of Marasmiaceae genera

References

Marasmiaceae
Agaricales genera